Shtatol also called Erzyan shtatol is a wax candle supported by an ornamented wooden vessel used in traditional Erzya rituals (erzja Ineškipazněń Kemema).

Etymology 
The oldest known use of this term in a non-Erzya source is in the Russian-language Explanatory Dictionary of the Living Great Russian Language published by Russian lexicographer Vladimir Dal in 1863.

Use and symbolism 
Shtatols symbolize life, ancestor reverence, and the passage of time. The wooden vessel in which the candle is placed is called a jandava. Jandavas are carved from solid linden trunks and are vaguely duck-shaped. Shtatols and jandavas are commonly used during Ras'ken' Ozks, Verya Ozks and other Erzya rituals.

References 

Religion in Russia
Religious symbols
Erzyas
Mordovian culture